The Trentham Park branch line was a  railway line that ran through the Trentham area of Stoke-on-Trent. It was last branch line to be built by the North Staffordshire Railway. Intended to route traffic to Trentham Gardens, the branch was authorised in 1907 and opened on 1 April 1910.

Abortive extension
By the time of its opening, local traffic was already being carried by road. As a result, the only intermediate station, Hanford Road Halt, was closed after just three years. However, the original plan was to extend the line to Pool Dam, Newcastle-under-Lyme, to  form a four mile long route around the growing suburbs. In preparation for this a steel bridge was constructed in September 1914 over London Road (now part of the A34) just beyond Trentham Park, but the extension was halted by World War I. It remained as a bridge to nowhere until 1940, when it was dismantled for scrap for the World War II effort.

World War II
During the war, the branch was at its busiest due to the Bankers' Clearing House having temporarily relocated the national cheque clearing house to the ballroom at the Trentham Estate. Numerous unpublicised passenger trains ran to serve it, along with a daily freight working.

Closure
After the war the line continued to be used for excursion trains from the Midlands, the last one running from Birmingham on 1 October 1957.

References

Closed railway lines in the West Midlands (region)
Rail transport in Stoke-on-Trent
North Staffordshire Railway
Railway lines opened in 1907
Railway stations closed in 1957